Carla Scaletti (born April 28, 1956) is an American harpist, composer, music technologist and the inventor of the Kyma Sound Design Environment as well as president of Symbolic Sound.

Biography
Carla Scaletti was born in Ithaca, New York. She graduated from the public schools in Albuquerque, New Mexico, then completed a Bachelor of Music from the University of New Mexico, a Master of Music from Texas Tech University, a master's in computer science from the University of Illinois and a doctorate in music composition from the same school. In the 1970s, she worked as principal harpist in the New Mexico Symphony Orchestra and Lubbock Symphony Orchestra, and composed for acoustic instruments, but later she developed an interest in computer generated music. After completing her education, she worked as a researcher at the CERL Sound Group, University of Illinois at Urbana-Champaign, and later as a visiting assistant professor at the University of Illinois before leaving the university to launch the Symbolic Sound Corporation.

Scaletti designed the Kyma sound generation computer language and co-founded Symbolic Sound Corporation with Kurt J. Hebel in 1989 as a spinoff of the CERL Sound Group.

Scaletti has published professional articles in the Computer Music Journal, proceedings of the OOPSLA and SPIE conferences, Perspectives of New Music, and as book chapters. In 2003 she received the Distinguished Alumnae Award for contributions in the field of music from Texas Tech University. From 2000 to 2007, she lectured at the Center for the Creation of Music Iannis Xenakis (CCMIX) in Paris.

Scaletti was a member of the executive committee for the IEEE Task Force on Computer Music, a member of the advisory board for the Electronic Music Foundation, and the founder and chair of SIGSound, a special interest group within the Association for Computing Machinery (ACM). Scaletti also serves as the president of the Salvatore Martirano Foundation.

In 2017, she was awarded the SEAMUS Award.

Works
Scaletti composes computer-generated music. Selected works include:

Motet for mezzo-soprano, narrator, harp, and bass clarinet (1977)
Yes for mezzo-soprano and electronic sound (1981)
Lysogeny for harp and computer-generated sound (1983)
X bar for piano and live electronics (1986)
Levulose for bass and computer-generated sound (1986)
SunSurgeAutomata computer-generated sound (1987)
Trinity for voice and interactive electronics (1989)
Mitochondria computer-generated sound (1994)
Public Organ interactive electronics (1995)
Lament for voice and interactive electronics (1999)
Tangled Timelines for harp and interactive electronics (1999)
Frog Pool Farm computer-generated sound (2002)
SlipStick for Continuum fingerboard controlling interactive electronics (2008)
Cyclonic computer-generated sound (2008)
Autocatalysis for audience and interactive electronics (2010)
Spider Galaxies contemporary dance piece by Gilles Jobin (2011) co-composed with Cristian Vogel
QUANTUM contemporary dance piece by Gilles Jobin (2013)
Conductus for organ, 3 singers and interactive electronics (2014)

Scaletti's works have been issued on CD, including:
CDCM Computer Music Series Vol. 3 University of Illinois at Urbana-Champaign. Audio CD (November 3, 1993) Centaur. ASIN: B0000057SZ

Kyma language has been used to prepare the soundtracks of films including:
War of the Worlds
Star Wars: Episode III – Revenge of the Sith
Finding Nemo
Star Wars: Episode II – Attack of the Clones
WALL-E
The Dark Knight
Master and Commander

Kyma language has been used to prepare the soundtracks of video games including:

World of Warcraft
Mirror's Edge
Dark Messiah
Quake II
Mage Knight

References

External links
 

1956 births
20th-century classical composers
American women classical composers
American classical composers
American music educators
American women music educators
Computer-based Education Research Laboratory
Experimental Music Studios alumni
Living people
American women in electronic music
20th-century American women musicians
20th-century American composers
20th-century women composers
21st-century American women